Patrick Edward Putnam (born December 3, 1953) is an American former professional baseball first baseman, who played in Major League Baseball (MLB) for the Texas Rangers, Seattle Mariners, and Minnesota Twins. Putnam also played for the Nippon-Ham Fighters of Nippon Professional Baseball (NPB).

Career

Amateur
Putnam attended Fort Myers Senior High School then the University of South Alabama. In 1973, he played collegiate summer baseball with the Orleans Cardinals of the Cape Cod Baseball League.

Texas Rangers
Putnam was selected by the Texas Rangers in the first round of the 1975 Major League Baseball draft. He had been drafted a year earlier by the New York Mets, but did not sign.

He had only two RBIs with the Rangers that season; however, they were both significant. He managed to drive in the only run in their 1-0 victory over the Seattle Mariners on September 22, and two days later, in the Rangers' 5-3 victory at Arlington Stadium over the Mariners, Putnam hit his first major league home run.

Putnam mostly appeared in the line-up as a designated hitter until May 28, when regular Rangers first baseman Mike Jorgensen was hit in the head by a pitch from Boston Red Sox pitcher Andy Hassler. Putnam took over as the Rangers' regular first baseman for the next month. Putnam made the most of the opportunity and batted .277 with 18 home runs and 64 RBIs to finish fourth in Rookie of the Year balloting.

Putnam failed to live up to his early promise, and in  found himself back in the minors with the Denver Bears of the American Association. During the off-season, he was traded to the Seattle Mariners for Ron Musselman.

Final seasons
After a season and a half in Seattle, Putnam was traded to the Minnesota Twins on August 29, .

References

External links

Major League Baseball first basemen
Texas Rangers players
Seattle Mariners players
Minnesota Twins players
Omaha Royals players
Tucson Toros players
Denver Bears players
Asheville Tourists players
Lynchburg Rangers players
Fort Myers Sun Sox players
Miami Dade Sharks baseball players
American expatriate baseball players in Japan
Nippon Ham Fighters players
1953 births
Living people
Orleans Firebirds players
South Alabama Jaguars baseball players
People from Bethel, Vermont